Vijaypath is a 1994 Indian Hindi-language action drama film starring Ajay Devgn, Tabu and Danny Denzongpa.

Plot
Justice Saxena's wife, the two children, and Rajesh Saxena leave the city. Dilawar Singh finds them and kills the Judge's wife and throws Babloo out of the running train. Before dying, Babloo donates his eyes to Karan. Karan vows that he will not remove his goggles till he confronts Dilawar Singh.

Cast

 Ajay Devgn as Karan/Karna in Mahabharata
 Tabu as Mohini/ Vrushali
 Danny Denzongpa as  Dhritarashtra/ Dilawar Singh
 Suresh Oberoi as Inspector Krishna/ Rajesh Saxena
 Reema Lagoo as Kunti/ Mrs. Saxena
 Gulshan Grover as Shakuni/ Duryodhana/Shakti B. Singh
 Vikas Anand as Judge Saxena
 Ram Mohan as Police Commissioner 
 Aparajita Bhushan as Mohini's mom
 Anant Jog as Bhawani Singh (younger brother of Dilawar Singh)
 Brijesh Tripathi as Driver Shankar (Karan's Father)
 Gurbachan Singh as Babban, Dilawar Henchmen
 Cheetah Yagnesh Shetty as Dilwar Henchmen
 Silk Smitha as item number "Kal Saiyan Ne Aisi Bowling Kari" (deleted)

Production
The role of Mohini/Vrushali was originally offered to Divya Bharti, however her sudden untimely demise led to her being replaced by Tabu.

Soundtrack

Track list

Box office
According to "Ibosnetwork" it collected 7.35 crore (lifetime collection) and was declared a "Hit" It was also the 10th highest grossing of Bollywood films of 1994.

Awards
40th Filmfare Awards:
Won
 Best Female Debut – Tabu

Nominated
 Best Villain – Danny Denzongpa
 Best Female Playback Singer – Alisha Chinai for "Ruk Ruk Ruk"
 Best Female Playback Singer – Alka Yagnik for "Raah Mein"

References

External links 
 

1994 films
1990s Hindi-language films
Films scored by Anu Malik
Indian action drama films
Indian films about revenge
1990s action drama films
Films directed by Farogh Siddique